Begdewadi railway station is a railway station on Pune Suburban Railway line. The station is near National Highway 48 (India) on Shelarwadi.

All local trains between Pune Junction–, Pune Junction–Talegaon, –Lonavala, Shivajinagar–Talegaon stops here.

Areas of Maval taluka near this station are Shelarwadi, Ghorawadi Caves, Somatne, Shirgaon.

References

Pune Suburban Railway
Pune railway division
Railway stations in Pune district